An autologous tumor cell is a cancer cell from an individual's own tumor.

References

 Autologous tumor cell entry in the public domain NCI Dictionary of Cancer Terms

Oncology